Nino Vingelli (4 June 1912 – 26 March 2003) was an Italian film actor. He appeared in more than 200 films between 1941 and 2000.

Selected filmography

 I mariti (Tempesta d'anime) (1941)
 The Betrothed (1941) - (uncredited)
 A che servono questi quattrini? (1942) - Il fruttivendolo
 Tempesta sul golfo (1943) - Cliente nella taverna
 Side Street Story (1950) - Giovanni
 Totò Tarzan (1950) - Capo stazione napoletano
 Women and Brigands (1950) - Ciccillo
 The Eternal Chain (1952) - Amedeo - Waiter (uncredited)
 The City Stands Trial (1952) - Pasqualino 'o 17
 Immortal Melodies (1952) - Fiorello
 Good Folk's Sunday (1953) - Un guappo napoletano
 Man, Beast and Virtue (1953)
 Legione straniera (1953) - Pietro
 La valigia dei sogni (1953) - Un detenuto
 Bread, Love and Dreams (1953) - Venditore ambulante
 Passione (1953)
 Cristo è passato sull'aia (1953)
 Daughters of Destiny (1954) - (segment "Elisabeth") (uncredited)
 The Country of the Campanelli (1954) - Capitano corrotto
 Of Life and Love (1954)
 Vestire gli ignudi (1954)
 Il seduttore (1954) - Onofrio
 Bread, Love and Jealousy (1954) - Venditore ambulante
 Toto Seeks Peace (1954) - Cameriere psicologo
 The Gold of Naples (1954) - Guappo (segment "Il guappo") (uncredited)
 Cento serenate (1954)
 Casta Diva (1954) - Il guappo
 Goodbye Naples (1955) - Pasqualino De Rosa
 Toto and Carolina (1955) - Brigadiere (uncredited)
 Chéri-Bibi (1955) - Palla di Gomma
 A Hero of Our Times (1955) - Brigadiere
 Cantami buongiorno tristezza (1955) - Guasco
 Nero's Weekend (1956)
 La rivale (1956) - Piedigrotta
 I vagabondi delle stelle (1956)
 Poveri ma belli (1957) - Old 'Pappagallo'
 Oh! Sabella (1957)
 Pretty But Poor (1957) - L'impiegato della gioielleria
 A sud niente di nuovo (1957)
 Un amore senza fine (1958)
 Piece of the Sky (1958) - Impresario
 Legs of Gold (1958) - Carmine
 La sfida (1958) - Gennaro
 Il bacio del sole (Don Vesuvio) (1958) - Il brigadiere Spanò
 Tuppe tuppe, Marescià! (1958) - Novità
 Non sono più Guaglione (1958) - Barman
 The Law (1959) - Pizzaccio
 Prepotenti più di prima (1959) - Il barista
 Un canto nel deserto (1959) - Un legionario
 Lui, lei e il nonno (1959)
 The Magliari (1959) - Vincenzo
 La nipote Sabella (1959)
 Ferdinando I, re di Napoli (1959) - The angry Card Player
 Purple Noon (1960) - Minor Role (uncredited)
 Ti aspetterò all'inferno (1960) - Show Director
 Pirates of the Coast (1960) - Porro
 Totò, Peppino e... la dolce vita (1961) - Spacciatore (uncredited)
 Black City (1961) - Il ministro Sgarra
 Mina... fuori la guardia (1961) - L'impresario
 Fra' Manisco cerca guai (1961) - Vincenzino
 Che femmina!! E... che dollari! (1961)
 Duel of Fire (1962) - Giuseppe Villetti 'Sila'
 Totò e Peppino divisi a Berlino (1962) - (uncredited)
 La leggenda di Fra Diavolo (1962)
 Lo sgarro (1962)
 Canzoni a tempo di twist (1962)
 The Conjugal Bed (1963) - Man at the Cemetery
 Attack and Retreat (1964) - Amalfitano
 The Sucker (1965) - (uncredited)
 I figli del leopardo (1965) - Farm manager
 Casanova 70 (1965) - Man talking about Santina (uncredited)
 God's Thunder (1965) - Le patron du café
 Giant of the Evil Island (1965) - Tortilla
 L'uomo che ride (1966) - Ursus
 Lightning Bolt (1966) - Rehte Beer Janitor
 Europa canta (1966) - Jack, Gangster
 Johnny Oro (1966) - Fat Friend of Gilmore
 War Between the Planets (1966) - Man at Conference
 After the Fox (1966) - 3rd Judge (uncredited)
 Shoot Loud, Louder... I Don't Understand (1966)
 Operation White Shark (1966)
 Giorno caldo al Paradiso Show (1966)
 Cisco (1966) - Doctor Martin
 7 monaci d'oro (1966) - Totonno
 Snow Devils (1967) - Peter
 Ballata da un miliardo (1967)
 Wanted (1967) - Honorable Townsman (uncredited)
 No Diamonds for Ursula (1967) - Carta Carbone
 Death Rides a Horse (1967) - Giocatore (uncredited)
 Death on the Run (1967) - Conducente del camioncino (uncredited)
 Hipnos follia di massacro (1967)
 Una ragazza tutta d'oro (1967) - Carabiniere
 Fantabulous Inc. (1967) - De Laurentiis, Producer of Commercial
 Delitto a Posillipo - Londra chiama Napoli (1967) - Napoletanino
 The Biggest Bundle of Them All (1968) - Restaurant Manager (uncredited)
 A Minute to Pray, a Second to Die (1968) - Man in Saloon (uncredited)
 Operazione ricchezza (1968)
 A suon di lupara (1968) - Il sindaco
 Zorro, the Navarra Marquis (1969) - Fra Pistola
 Puro siccome un Angelo papà mi fece monaco... di Monza (1969)
 Ma chi t'ha dato la patente? (1970)
 Many Wars Ago (1970) - Soldato presunto autoferito
 I due maghi del pallone (1970) - Don Alfio
 Mezzanotte d'amore (1970) - Ferdinando
 Gang War (1971) - Pasquale - il barista
 Ma che musica maestro (1971) - Train passenger
 Black Belly of the Tarantula (1971) - Inspector Di Giacomo
 Drummer of Vengeance (1971) - Poker Player
 Armiamoci e partite! (1971) - Train Employee
 I due assi del guantone (1971)
 Un apprezzato professionista di sicuro avvenire (1972) - Maresciallo
 Gang War in Naples (1972) - Prisoner
 Storia di fifa e di coltello - Er seguito d'er più (1972) - Cart-driver
 Le mille e una notte... e un'altra ancora! (1973) - Kadi
 Bella, ricca, lieve difetto fisico, cerca anima gemella (1973) - Newspaper Vendor
 The Black Hand (1973) - Don Gaetano
 Little Funny Guy (1973)
 Flatfoot (1973) - Old Man of Camorra
 Il figlioccio del padrino (1973) - Don Vincenzo Assistant #2
 I guappi (1974) - Gigino la Charonge
 Furia nera (1975)
 Violent Naples (1976) - Don Antonio Polipo
 Blazing Flowers (1978) - Nicola
 Ring (1978) - Don Alfonsino
 The Payoff (1978) - Catelli
 Napoli serenata calibro 9 (1978) - Ricettatore
 Lo scugnizzo (1979)
 Café Express (1980) - Prete
 Carcerato (1981) - Maestro Scardeca
 Guapparia (1983)
 Spiaccichiccicaticelo (1984)
 Torna (1984)
 Teresa (1987) - Adelmo
 Kaputt Mundi (1998) - Don Pepe
 Tobia al caffè (2000) - Avvocato

References

External links

1912 births
2003 deaths
Italian male film actors
Nastro d'Argento winners
20th-century Italian male actors
Male actors from Naples